Avenir Ivanovitch Sumin (aka. A. I. Sumin) was a competitor of the Fabergé's art in St. Petersburg, "Supplier to the Court". His workshop was founded by his father, Ivan Sumin, in 1869 at 46 Nevsky Prospekt, St. Petersburg. In 1882 Avenir Sumin obtained a prize for the carving of semi-precious stones at the Moscow All-Russian Industrial Art Exhibition. Produced clocks, cigarette cases and frames, marked with his initial and full name in Cyrillic characters. Sumin used the same colour-scheme as Britzin, with a predilection for white enamel and the occasional unexpected turquoise. Also specializing in the carving of stones from Siberia and the Caucasus. Sumin's shop offered the objects in birchwood cases inspired by those of Fabergé. Also Sumin resold many objects made by Fabergé or other famous Russian jewellery workmasters. Many objects, including white enamel cigarette cases and miniature Easter eggs in pale pink, yellow, mauve and blue are stamped A.A., standing presumably for A. Astreyden, who seems to have had a working relationship with Sumin.

References

Additional sources 
 G.von Habsburg-Lothringen & A.von Solodkoff, Fabergé - Court Jeweler to the Tsars (1979) 
 Geoffrey Watts, Russian Silversmiths' Hallmarks (1700 to 1917) (2006)
 М.М. Постникова-Лосева, Н.Г.П. Платонова, Б.Л. Ульяноа, ЗОЛОТОЕ И СЕРЕБРЯНОЕ ДЕЛО XV-XX вв. (2003)

Goldsmiths from the Russian Empire
Silversmiths from the Russian Empire
1858 births
1933 deaths